Tales of the Unexpected may refer to:

Tales of the Unexpected (comics), a 1950s-1960s comic book
Tales of the Unexpected (book), a collection of short stories by Roald Dahl
Tales of the Unexpected (TV series), a British series inspired by Dahl's stories
Quinn Martin's Tales of the Unexpected, a 1977 American television show known in the United Kingdom as Twist in the Tale

See also
More Tales of the Unexpected, a short story collection by Roald Dahl